Hanni Toosbuy Kasprzak (born 1957) is a Danish billionaire, the owner and chair of ECCO, the Danish shoe company which was founded by her father in 1963.

Early life
Hanni Toosbuy was born in 1957. Her father, Karl Toosbuy, founded ECCO in 1963.

Career
Kasprzak joined ECCO on completing her school education. When she was only 21, she complied with her father's request to work in quality control in India. "I spent more than a year there," she explained. "Learning at the factory level is possibly the best way to understand a business." After India, she went to Germany but returned to Denmark in 1997 as ECCO chairman.

Since March 2014, she has also been a member of Sydbank's advisory board.

Personal life
Toosbuy is married to Dieter Kasprzak, who has served as ECCO's president since 2004. Their son, André, is a golfer and their daughter, Anna, practices dressage.

References

1957 births
Living people
Danish billionaires
Danish business executives
Danish women business executives
Female billionaires
20th-century Danish businesswomen
20th-century Danish businesspeople
21st-century Danish businesswomen
21st-century Danish businesspeople